Jéssica Adriana Guillén Blanco (born March 27, 1985, in Caracas, Venezuela) is a Venezuelan beauty pageant titleholder who represented Amazonas in Miss Venezuela 2009, on September 24, 2009, and won the title of 2nd runner up. Guillén also competed in Chica E! Venezuela 2008 pageant on August 7, 2008, in Caracas, Venezuela.

She won the Miss Atlantico Internacional 2010 pageant ("Miss Atlantic International"), in Punta del Este (Uruguay), on January 23, 2010.

References

External links
Miss Venezuela Official Website
Miss Venezuela La Nueva Era MB
Jessica Guillén in Modelosdevenezuela.com

1985 births
Living people
People from Caracas
Venezuelan beauty pageant winners